Carmely Reiska (born 8 August 2002) is an Estonian rhythmic gymnast.

Personal life 
Reiska took up rhythmic gymnastics at age four, encouraged by her mother. She graduated from the Kadriorg German Gymnasium in 2018 and continued her high school education there. Carmely's hobbies are reading, watching films, computer programming.

Career 
In 2016-2017, Reiska was a member of the Estonian junior group, winning two Estonian group championship in 2016 and 2017, and from the end of 2017 until December 2021 she trained as part of the national senior group.

She competed at the European Championships in 2017 in Budapest, Hungary,  Guadalajara, Spain in 2018 and Kyiv, Ukraine in 2020. Carmely participated in the 2019 European Games in Minsk, Belarus, where she finished 7th overall with her group, and has competed in two World Championships (2018 Sofia, Bulgaria and 2021 Kitakyushu, Japan), finishing 13th in both events.

With the team she won silver in the 3 balls + 2 ropes final and bronze with 5 hoops at the 2018 Grand-Prix in Holon, Israel, 5 balls' bronze the 2019 Grand-Prix Thiais, bronze in the 5 balls final at the 2021 Moscow Grand-Prix. She was also part of the group that won Estonia their first medal at the 2020 European Championship, getting bronze in the 5 balls final.

References 

2002 births
Living people
Estonian rhythmic gymnasts
Sportspeople from Tallinn
Medalists at the Rhythmic Gymnastics European Championships